The Arboretum de Montsûrs is an arboretum and nature walk located at the Place des Anciens-Combattants, Montsûrs, Mayenne, Pays de la Loire, France. It consists of a loop trail (almost 1 km) along the River Jouanne, with an information panel, and is open daily without charge.

See also 
 List of botanical gardens in France

References 
 BaLaDO.fr entry (French)
 Pays de La Loire entry (French)

Gardens in Mayenne
Montsurs